Majka is the Polish version of the popular Venezuelan soap opera Juana la virgen. It was broadcast on weekdays on TVN from Monday, January 4, 2010. The pilot episode had been broadcast on Tuesday, December 22, 2009 after the final episode of Brzydula.

Plot 
The series follows the fortunes of Majka Olkowicz, who is a photography student at the Academy of Fine Arts in Kraków and fighting for a scholarship to a prestigious university in Florence. However, an unintended pregnancy destroys these plans. Majka begins work in the Panorama Project company, whose boss is Michał Duszyński, the father of the baby.

Cast

External links 
 Majka at IMDb
 Official profile in Filmpolski.pl database

2010 Polish television series debuts
2010 telenovelas
Polish television soap operas
2010 Polish television series endings
TVN (Polish TV channel) original programming
Television shows remade overseas